This article lists political parties in Lesotho.

Parties

Parliamentary parties

Other parties
Alliance of Congress Parties (ACP)
Alliance for Free Movement (AFM)
Basotho Batho Democratic Party (BBDP)
Basotho Democratic National Party (BDNP)
Basotho Patriotic Party (BPP)
Basutoland African Congress (BAC)
Basutoland Congress Party (BCP)
Communist Party of Lesotho (CPL)
Lesotho People's Congress (LPC)
Lesotho Workers' Party (LWP)
Marematlou Freedom Party (MFP)
National Progressive Party (NPP)
Reformed Congress of Lesotho (RCL)ì
 United For Change (UFC)
 Basotho Liberation Movement (BLM)

See also
 List of political parties by country
 Politics of Lesotho
 

Lesotho
 
Political parties
Lesotho
Political parties